Tanjay City Science High School (TCSHS) is a public high school located in Tanjay City, Negros Oriental, Philippines.  It is a DepEd-recognized science high school.

Established in 2003, its first graduating class was composed of 13 students. Following that year, the school moved campuses from a smaller location to its present-day campus. The school has adapted e-classroom applications with the help from the Department of Education.

References

Science high schools in the Philippines
High schools in Negros Oriental
2003 establishments in the Philippines
Educational institutions established in 2003